The Russo-Serbian Alliance was signed on 10 July 1807 between Revolutionary Serbia under Đorđe Petrović (Karađorđe) and the Russian Empire, during the First Serbian Uprising. After the Ottoman Empire had allied itself with Napoleon's France in late 1806, and was subsequently at war with Russia and Britain, it sought to meet the demands of the Serbian rebels. At the same time, the Russians offered the Serbs aid and cooperation. The Serbs chose alliance with the Russians over autonomy under the Ottomans (as set by the "Ičko's Peace"). Karađorđe was to receive arms, and military and medical missions, which proved to be a turning point in the Serbian Revolution.

The Russians sought Serbian military protection to the Russian right flank, while the Serbs sought to establish a nation-state encompassing also Bosnia and Herzegovina, and the pashaliks of Vidin, Niš, Leskovac and Novi Pazar.

See also 
 Timeline of the Serbian Revolution
 Russo-Turkish War (1806–1812)
 Anglo-Turkish War (1807–1809)

References 
 
 

1807 treaties
19th-century military alliances
Treaties of the Russian Empire
Treaties of the Principality of Serbia
Military alliances involving Russia
Military alliances involving Serbia
19th century in the Russian Empire
19th century in Serbia
Russia–Serbia military relations
First Serbian Uprising
Bilateral treaties of Russia